Den ofrivillige golfaren, also known in English as The Accidental Golfer and The Involuntary Golfer, is a Swedish comedy film and the fourth installment of the popular Sällskapsresan series directed by Lasse Åberg. It was released to cinemas in Sweden on 25 December 1991. Åberg won the award for Best Actor in a leading role at the 27th Guldbagge Awards. The film was inspired by the golf stories of author P. G. Wodehouse.

Plot 
The business cycle in Sweden is booming. Hapless Stig-Helmer Olsson (Lasse Åberg) is laid off from a toaster factory and gets an offer to play a one-on-one golf competition against a wealthy man for money, something he has never done before. He travels to Scotland to learn to play golf, taking lessons by the skilled golf veteran Roderic McDougall (Jimmy Logan).

Cast
Lasse Åberg as Stig-Helmer Olsson
Jon Skolmen as Ole Bramserud
Jimmy Logan as Roderic McDougall
Margo Gunn as Fiona McDougall
Barbro Hiort af Ornäs as Stig-Helmer's mother
Claes Månsson as Scientist
Mats Bergman as Bruno Anderhage
Annalisa Ericson as Alice
John Fiske as TV-host
Sydney Coulson as Malcolm
Lovisa Bogg-Lindkvist as Anderhage's daughter
Simon Bogg-Lindkvist as Anderhage's son

Reception
The film had a record opening weekend in Sweden with 153,992 admissions.

References

External links

1991 films
Films directed by Lasse Åberg
1990s Swedish-language films
Golf films
1990s sports comedy films
Films set in Scotland
Films shot in the Scottish Borders
Swedish sports comedy films
1991 comedy films
1990s Swedish films